Norrie Haywood was a Scottish professional association footballer who played as a forward. He played for Watford F.C., Queen of the South, Peebles Rovers, Raith Rovers and St Bernard's F.C.

Watford

Norrie Haywood made one first team appearance for Watford in 1933. The center forward after leaving Watford in May 1934,went on trial in August 1934 with both Clapton Orient in London and Berwick Rangers before joining Peebles Rovers the following month. He was born in Portobello, Midlothian, Scotland on 7 September 1910 and died in Edinburgh on 30 July 1979, aged sixty-eight. Source: Neilson N. Kaufman, Honorary historian Leyton Orient FC.

Queen of the South

In 1935, George McLachlan became Queen of the South manager and in May 1936 he took Queens on an eleven-game tour to France, Luxembourg and Algeria. In France they played against such teams as Montpellier HSC (losing 4–2) and Stade Reims (winning 5–4).

The tour included competing in a four team invitational tournament in Algiers. With Algeria then under French colonial rule the official programme listed the venue as "Stade-Velodrome Municipal d'Alger" and the participants as:

Le Queen of the South- La Belle Equipe Ecossaise de Première Division

Racing-Club de Santander- Favori des Championnats d'Espagne

Floriana F. C. de Malte- Champion Officiel et Vainqueur de la Coupe

R.U.A.- Champion de l'Afrique du Nord 1935

The match days were 21 May and 24 May.

Home side Racing Universitaire d'Alger (R.U.A. for whom Nobel Prize winning author-philosopher Albert Camus had played in goals for its junior team) had already won both the North African Champions Cup and the North African Cup in the 1930s (R.U.A. would win each twice by the decade's end). Goals by Willie Thomson and Joe Tulip (the Northumbrian was one of the first Englishmen to play in the Scottish League) saw Queens book a place in the invitational tournament final with a 2–1 victory against them.

In the final Queens faced a Racing de Santander side who had just finished 4th in Spain's La Liga notching home and away double victories against both Real Madrid and F.C. Barcelona. Norrie Haywood's goal and a 1–0 scoreline saw victory for La Belle Equipe Ecossaise. The trophy can still be seen in QoS' club museum today.

Raith Rovers
Norrie Haywood was at Raith Rovers in the season they scored the UK record number of league goals in a season, 142. Haywood top scored for Rovers with 47 strikes.

References

People from Portobello, Edinburgh
Footballers from Edinburgh
Queen of the South F.C. players
Watford F.C. players
St Bernard's F.C. players
Raith Rovers F.C. players
Peebles Rovers F.C. players
Association football forwards
Year of birth missing
Scottish footballers